Carlos Lobos may refer to:

 Carlos Lobos (footballer) (born 1997), Chilean footballer
 Carlos Lobos (equestrian) (born 1980), Chilean Olympic eventing rider